VPX is a computer bus standard.

VPX may also refer to:

 Vpx, Viral Protein X, a protein
 VPX Sports, and VPX, brand names of Vital Pharmaceuticals
 Victorian Power Exchange, established by the Government of Victoria, Australia
 VPX, video technology by NewBlue
 Vodafone VPx, see HTC Blue Angel

See also
 OpenVPX, an Industry Working Group of defense contractors